Samir Bengelloun (born February 2, 1985) is a French footballer. His older brother Youness formerly played for Bulgarian side Lokomotiv Plovdiv

On September 2008, Bengelloun joined APOP Kinyras Peyias with which on May 17, 2009 he won the Cypriot Cup 2008-09.

Honours
Cypriot Cup:
Winners (1): 2009

External links
Profile at cfa.com.cy

1985 births
Living people
French footballers
French expatriate footballers
Levallois SC players
ES Troyes AC players
APOP Kinyras FC players
PFC Lokomotiv Plovdiv players
AS Poissy players
Ligue 2 players
First Professional Football League (Bulgaria) players
Cypriot First Division players
Expatriate footballers in Cyprus
Expatriate footballers in Bulgaria

Association football defenders
Moroccan expatriate sportspeople in Cyprus